The Rotunda Zamość or the Museum of Martyrdom of the Zamość region - Rotunda, is a Polish museum devoted to remembering the atrocities committed at the former Rotunda Zamość Nazi German camp located in Zamość near Lublin. The Nazi German Gestapo camp was set up in occupied Poland during World War II, as part of the Polish extermination program known as the German AB-Aktion in Poland, Ethnic cleansing of Zamojszczyzna by Nazi Germany....

History

Rotunda was built between 1825 and 1831 in accordance with the design of General Jean-Baptiste Mallet de Grandville. Was part of the fortifications of the Zamość Fortress. During World War II and German AB-Aktion in Poland in 1940 was taken over by the German Gestapo precinct. It served as a prison, holding camp and a place off mass execution of Polish people.

8000 people died in the Gestapo Rotunda camp in Zamość. Nobody was tried for those crimes. During Generalplan Ost and Ethnic cleansing of Zamojszczyzna by Nazi Germany from Zamość Region Germans resettled 297 villages, about 110,000 Polish people, including 16,000 to Majdanek concentration camp, 2,000 to KL Auschwitz-Birkenau. 30,000 children were resettled. 4,500 Polish children from Zamosc Region deported to Germany in order to be Germanized.

The gate which leads to the yard has the original doors with an inscription in German which reads: The temporary camp for the prisoners of Security Police. In German: Gefangenen-Durchgangslager Sicherheitspol.

Last execution took place on 20 and 21 July 1944, when 150 people were shot.

In the center of the courtyard there is a stone plaque commemorating the site of the cremation of human bodies. Here Nazi criminals burnt the bodies of the victims they had murdered, prisoners of the Rotunda. May they rest in peace.

On the cemetery around the Rotunda lie the ashes of more than 45 thousand people.

Rotunda. War cemetery.
 Quarter of Soldiers of the Polish Army killed in September 1939 in Invasion of Poland
 Quarter of the Soldiers of the Home Army
 Quarter of the Victims of Nazi Genocide
 Quarter of the Soldiers of the Red Army
 Quarter of Jewish Victims
 The Grave of the Victims of Stalin's Genocide

Prisoners of Rotunda included Dr Zygmunt Klukowski, blessed Stanisław Kostka Starowieyski, 16 year-old schoolgirl scout Grażyna Kierszniewska, 17 year-old schoolgirl Danuta Sztarejko, Celina Sztarejko, count Aleksander Szeptycki, Michał Nowacki (Vice Mayor of Zamość), Wacław Bajkowski (president of Lublin), colonel Zdzisław Maćkowski (Home Army Soldier), his sons Zdzisław and Jan, his wife Pelagia Maćkowska, Michał Wazowski (Mayor of Zamość), priest Antoni Gomółka (chaplain of scouts), farmer Władysław Szala, his 19-year-old son Jan Szala, and notary Henryk Rosiński. It is estimated that over 50,000 people passed through the camp.

Gallery

See also
 Home Army
 Ethnic cleansing of Zamojszczyzna by Nazi Germany
 Expulsion of Poles by Nazi Germany
 Forced labour under German rule during World War II
 German AB-Aktion in Poland
 General Government
 German camps in occupied Poland during World War II
 History of Zamość
 Intelligenzaktion
 Invasion of Poland
 Museum of Zamość
 Nazi crimes against the Polish nation
 Occupation of Poland (1939–1945)
 War crimes in occupied Poland during World War II

Notes

References 
 J. Kowalczyk, Zamość. Przewodnik, Zamość, Zamojski Ośrodek Informacji Turystycznej, 1995.
 Zygmunt Klukowski, Zamojszczyzna I. 1918-1943 and Zamojszczyzna II. 1944-1953, Karta, Warszawa 2007.
 Maria Rzeźniak, The Zamojska Rotunda. Rotunda Zamojska., Zamość 2007, .
 Virtual Shtetl, Rotunda – niemieckie więzienie śledcze (1940–1944)

External links

 Rotunda & Martyrdom Museum at lonelyplanet.com
 The Rotunda - Martyrs' Museum at travelguide.michelin.com
 ROTUNDA – Zamojszczyzna Martrys Mausoleum at poland.travel
 THE ROTUNDA at zamosc.pl
 Old City of Zamość at whc.unesco.org

1944 in Poland
General Government
Nazi concentration camps in Poland
Rotundas in Europe
World War II sites of Nazi Germany
World War II museums in Poland
1940 in Poland
Buildings and structures in Zamość
Poland in World War II
World War II sites in Poland
Museums in Lublin Voivodeship
Monuments and memorials in Poland